Fellaster zelandiae, which is also called a cake urchin, or the snapper biscuit, is an echinoderm of the family Arachnoididae, endemic to New Zealand. The maximum width of this type of echinoderm is 100 mm.

References

 Miller M & Batt G, Reef and Beach Life of New Zealand, William Collins (New Zealand) Ltd, Auckland, New Zealand 1973

Clypeasteridae
Echinoderms of New Zealand